Borreraig is a crofting settlement in Duirinish, north-west of Dunvegan on the Isle of Skye. The ancient and famous MacCrimmon Piping Heritage Centre is based in the village, where the chiefs of the Highlands sent their young pipers for training.

References

Populated places in the Isle of Skye